Lepidodactylus is a large genus of geckos, commonly known as scaly-toed geckos and closely related to house geckos or dtellas.

Geographic range 
Species in the genus Lepidodactylus are found from Southeast Asia to Indo-Australia and Oceania.

Species 
There are 44 described species in this genus, which are considered valid.

‡ Nota bene: A taxon author (binomial authority) in parentheses indicates that the species was originally described in a genus other than Lepidodactylus.

Eponyms 
The specific name, browni, is in honor of American herpetologist Walter Creighton Brown.

The specific name, christiani, is in honor of U.S. Army Lieutenant Ralph L. Christian.

The specific name, gardineri, is in honor of British zoologist John Stanley Gardiner.

The specific name, guppyi, is in honor of British naturalist Henry Brougham Guppy.

The specific name, herrei, is in honor of American ichthyologist Albert William Herre.

The specific name, manni, is in honor of American entomologist William Montana Mann.

The specific name, oorti, is in honor of Dutch ornithologist Eduard Daniël van Oort.

The specific name, woodfordi, is in honor of British naturalist Charles Morris Woodford.

References

Further reading 
Fitzinger L (1843). Systema Reptilium, Fasciculus Primus, Amblyglossae. Vienna: Braumüller & Seidel. 106 pp. + indices. (Lepidodactylus, new genus, p. 98). (in Latin).

 
Taxa named by Leopold Fitzinger
Lizard genera